The 1938 Kırşehir earthquake occurred at 12:59 local time on 19 April. It had an estimated surface wave magnitude of 6.7 and a maximum intensity of IX (Violent) on the Mercalli intensity scale, causing 224 casualties.

See also
List of earthquakes in 1938
List of earthquakes in Turkey

References

1938 Kırşehir
1938 earthquakes
1938 in Turkey
History of Kırşehir Province
April 1938 events